Eastern Hills Mall is a shopping mall located 11 miles northeast of Buffalo, New York on the western border of the Town of Clarence in Erie County, New York, United States. It lies on Transit Road (New York State Route 78). The mall is north of the junction of NY-78 with NY-5, and Main Street. The name "Eastern Hills" refers to the very low hills that contribute to a slightly higher elevation than the bordering areas along the Onondaga Escarpment. Eastern Hills Mall is part of a long commercial strip on Transit Road. Currently the mall is anchored by JCPenney, Niagara Emporium, Orvis, and Raymour & Flanigan.

It consists of two long wings running north and south and one short wing running east and west, which connects the north-south wings in a "double L-shaped" formation. A major department store is at the end of each wing. A food court is located adjacent to the end of the long south wing.

History
The Eastern Hills Mall was developed by the Edward J. DeBartolo Corporation. The mall was originally to be named "Buffalo Mall", but the name was changed to Eastern Hills Mall at the request of the town of Clarence. Construction began in 1969. The mall was opened on November 8, 1971. The original anchors were AM&A's, JCPenney, Sears, Jenss, Woolworth and Hengerer's.  General Cinema  opened the Eastern Hills Cinema I-II about six months later on May 24, 1972.  
Hengerer's became Sibley's in 1981.
 
The mall underwent an extensive overhaul in 1987 that added a food court. The only other expansion the mall sought was a Lechmere store next to JCPenney, but never opened. Originally the largest mall in the Buffalo, NY area, the mall lost that title to the Walden Galleria in 1989. Sibley's became Kaufmann's in 1990. AM&A's became The Bon-Ton in 1994. In 1997, Jenss closed. In 1998, Burlington Coat Factory moved into the former Jenss location. 

Another renovation to the small east-west center concourse and food court took place in 2005, largely cosmetic in nature. New floor tile was installed in both the center concourse and food court, and imitation fireplaces, small flat screen televisions, and new seating were installed. The longer north-south concourses remained untouched during this second renovation, causing a break in a pink zig-zag floor tile line pattern, which prior to the 2005 renovation existed through the entire mall from end-to-end. In late 2006, Federated Department Stores converted all local Kaufmann's stores to Macy's. By this time, the mall featured many younger national chains. Television station WBBZ-TV established its broadcast studios at the mall in 2012.

The later 2010's saw multiple traditional chain anchors update their brick-and-mortar fleets after being disrupted by digital retailers in recent years.
In April 2016, Macy's, which maintains several much larger outposts around Western New York, announced as part of a strategy to focus on their highest achieving locations that they would be leaving the center. It was transformed into Niagara Emporium. On August 29, 2018, regional division The Bon-Ton shuttered and it's space was converted to Raymour & Flanigan. In December 2018, after 47 years of operation Sears shuttered as part of an ongoing plan to phase out of brick-and-mortar and was announced to become BFLO, a department store. In June 2022 as part of Uniland's plans for the property BFLO transitioned to a store at nearby Transitown Plaza. Uniland's current plans for the mall include further developing the property with residential apartments creating a mixed-use development dubbed a "lifestyle shopping center". 

As of 2022, Eastern Hills Mall is currently at approximately 99% occupancy.

Non-commercial activity 

After the October Storm of 2006, which devastated much of the surrounding area, the parking lot of Eastern Hills served as a focal point for clean up and restoration of services.  Many utility companies used the parking lot as a ramada for parking vehicles at night and a dispatch point by day.  In addition, part of the lot was used for storing materials used to restore power to the area.

Future
In March 2018, Uniland Development, a local commercial development company, agreed to purchase a stake in the mall's equity, sharing co-ownership with current owners Mountain Development Corporation. Uniland's future plans for the mall are to convert some of the property to residential apartments and create a mixed-use development that it dubbed a "lifestyle shopping center." The Clarence Town Board approved plans for the mall in August 2018.

Uniland and Mountain Development attained the services of Gensler in January 2019. Similar projects they have worked include upscale shopping centers The Domain, Legacy West, and River Oaks Shopping Center. The first updates were unveiled in March 2020. A proposal was filed with Clarence town officials in June 2021.

References

External links 
 Comments about Eastern Hills

Shopping malls in New York (state)
Tourist attractions in Erie County, New York
Buildings and structures in Erie County, New York